Mesquitinha  (born Olympio Bastos; 19 April 1902 – 10 June 1956) was a Portuguese-born Brazilian actor, comedian and director. He appeared in a number of Chanchadas during the 1930s and 1940s including Hello, Hello, Brazil! (1935) and Samba in Berlin (1943).

Selected filmography

Director 
 Onde Estás Felicidade? (1939)

Actor
 Estudantes (1935)
 Hello, Hello Brazil! (1935)
 Samba in Berlin (1943)

References

Bibliography
Dennison, Stephanie & Shaw, Lisa. Popular Cinema in Brazil. Manchester University Press, 2004

External links 

1902 births
1956 deaths
Portuguese film directors
Portuguese male film actors
Brazilian film directors
Brazilian male film actors
People from Lisbon
20th-century Brazilian male actors
Portuguese emigrants to Brazil